Nothin' but the Blues may refer to:
 Nothin' but the Blues (Elkie Brooks album)
 Nothin' but the Blues (Joe Williams album)
 Nothin' but the Blues (Johnny Winter album)
 Nothin' but the Blues (Gary B. B. Coleman album)